The Men's individual pursuit LC4 track cycling event at the 2004 Summer Paralympics was competed from 18 to 19 September. It was won by Michael Teuber, representing .

Qualifying

18 Sept. 2004, 10:00

Final round

19 Sept. 2004, 15:10
Gold

Bronze

References

M